The Senior women's race at the 2011 IAAF World Cross Country Championships was held at the Polideportivo Antonio Gil Hernández in Punta Umbría, Spain, on March 20, 2011.  Reports of the event were given for the IAAF.

Complete results for individuals, and for teams were published.

Race results

Senior women's race (8 km)

Individual

Teams

Note: Athletes in parentheses did not score for the team result.

Participation
According to an unofficial count, 102 athletes from 26 countries participated in the Senior women's race.  This is in agreement with the official numbers as published.

 (5)
 (6)
 (1)
 (3)
 (1)
 (1)
 (4)
 (6)
 (3)
 (2)
 (5)
 (6)
 (6)
 (5)
 (3)
 (6)
 (2)
 (1)
 (6)
 (6)
 (4)
 (5)
 (2)
 (6)
 (6)
 (1)

See also
 2011 IAAF World Cross Country Championships – Senior men's race
 2011 IAAF World Cross Country Championships – Junior men's race
 2011 IAAF World Cross Country Championships – Junior women's race

References

Senior women's race at the World Athletics Cross Country Championships
IAAF World Cross Country Championships
2011 in women's athletics